The 1922 United States Senate election in Florida was held on November 7, 1922. 

Incumbent Democratic Senator Park Trammell was easily re-elected to a second term in office over Independent Republican W. C. Lawson.

General election

Candidates
Park Trammell, incumbent Senator since 1917 (Democratic)
W. C. Lawson (Independent Republican)

Results

See also 
 1922 United States Senate elections

References 

1922
Florida
United States Senate